Under the Whyte notation for the classification of steam locomotives by wheel arrangement, the  is a Garratt articulated locomotive. The wheel arrangement is effectively two 2-4-2 locomotives operating back to back, with the boiler and cab suspended between the two power units. Each power unit has a single pair of leading wheels in a leading truck, followed by two coupled pairs of driving wheels, with a single pair of trailing wheels in a trailing truck. Since the  type is sometimes known as a Columbia, the corresponding Garratt type could be referred to as a Double Columbia.

Overview
This was the rarest of all Garratt types, with only one class of four locomotives constructed to this wheel arrangement. It most likely evolved from the 2-4-0+0-4-2 Double Porter Garratt, with the trailing wheels added on each engine unit to improve stability at speed.

Usage

Brazil
All four 2-4-2+2-4-2 locomotives were built in 1943 by Beyer, Peacock and Company for the  Leopoldina Railway in Brazil. The locomotives were allocated engine numbers in the range from 400 to 403 on that system.

References

 
 
4,2-4-2+2-4-2
Whyte notation